is a Japanese private university with its headquarters in 1-1-49 Higashi, Shibuya, Tokyo. It was founded in 1899 and established as a university in 1950. Its university abbreviation is

Overview

University as a whole 
 A Japanese private junior college established within Shibuya City, Tokyo by the Jissen Women's Educational Institute. Established in 1950 when the junior college system was introduced, it is composed of two departments.

Founding spirit (school motto, ideals and faith) 
 The founding spirit in Jissen Women's University Junior College has become "Nurturing women who are capable of displaying dignity, elegance, independence and self-management."

Education and research 
 Education in Jissen Women's University Junior College
 The Department of Japanese Communication: There are subjects concerning communication, Japanese literature, women's literature as well as subjects such as "Children's Literature" and "Women's Literature." Furthermore, it results in a system in which one continues to take subjects in accordance with each course, "Communication Skills" and "Information Skills."
 The Department of English Communication: In addition to common subjects such as "Practical Career Planning" and "Integrated English a.b," it results in a system in which one continues to take subjects in accordance with each course, "Tourism Business" and "International Communication."
 In fiscal 2020, America, England, Canada, China, South Korea, France, Germany and Malaysia were cited as destinations for summer overseas language training. Currently, TOEFL exams and interviews are not being conducted.

Academic culture and features 
 Established in the year following the opening of Jissen Women's University, its history as a JC is long. In fiscal 2020, they celebrated the 70th anniversary of its establishment.
 There are many students who transfer to Jissen Women's University after graduating from the JC, because departments similar to those of the university are established.

Brief history 
 1882 (Meiji's 15th Year) Tōyō School was founded. It becomes a pioneer of private women's education in Japan.
 1899 (Meiji's 32nd Year) Jissen Girls' School is established in Kōjimachi, Tokyo.
 1916 (Taishō's 5th Year) They open the summer self-improvement dormitory "Senkaku-shō" in Sengokuhara, Hakone Town.
Initially, it had only one department, Home Economics Department, and its location was Tokiwamatsu Town, Shibuya City.
 1951 (Shōwa's 26th Year) They separate the Home Economics Department into two majors: Human Life Major and Apparel and Textiles Major.
 1952 (Shōwa's 27th Year) They add the departments, the Japanese Literature Department and the English Literature Department.
 1967 (Shōwa's 42nd Year) They separate the Home Economics Department into three courses: Human Life, Nutrition and Apparel and Textiles. They launch courses on library science and natural history.
 1968 (Shōwa's 43rd Year) They rename it .
 1972 (Shōwa's 47th Year) They relocate it to the site of Shukutoku Gakuen Junior College in Matsubushi Town, Kita-Katsushika District, Saitama Prefecture.
 1976 (Shōwa's 51st Year) They transfer Matsubushi Campus to Taishō University, and relocate it to Jissen Women's University Campus in Hino City.
 1988 (Shōwa's 63rd Year) They change the department names.
 Japanese Literature Department → The Department of Japanese Literature
 English Literature Department → The Department of English Literature
 Home Economics Department → The Department of Life and Culture. They further separate it into the following majors.
 Life and Culture Major
 Food Science and Nutrition Major
 2000 (Heisei's 12th Year) Changes in the department names are carried out again.
 The Department of Japanese Literature → The Department of Japanese Communication
 The Department of English Literature → The Department of English Communication
 The Department of Life and Culture
 Life and Culture Major → The Department of Living and Welfare
 Food Science and Nutrition Major → The Department of Food Science and Nutrition
 2005 (Heisei's 17th Year) A nutrition educator program is launched.
 2011 (Heisei's 23rd Year) They suspend the recruitment of students for the Department of Living and Welfare.
 2013 (Heisei's 25th Year) They suspend the recruitment of students for the Department of Food Science and Nutrition.
 2014 (Heisei's 26th Year) They rename it Jissen Women's University Junior College (Department). They relocate the junior college's campus to Shibuya City, Tokyo.

Basic data

Location 
 1-1-49 Higashi, Shibuya City, Tokyo (Shibuya Campus)

Transportation access 
 Approximately 10-minute walk from JR (Yamanote Line, Saikyō Line, Shōnan-Shinjuku Line)/Tokyo Metro (Ginza Line, Hanzōmon Line, Fukutoshin Line)/Tōkyū (Tōyoko Line, Den-en-toshi Line)/Keiō Inokashira Line East Exit C1 from Shibuya Station.
 Approximately 12-minute walk from Tokyo Metro (Ginza Line, Hanzōmon Line, Chiyoda Line) Exit B1 from Omotesandō Station.

Image 
 The college mark of Jissen Women's University Junior College has the image of a cherry blossom.

Education and Research

Organization

Departments 
 Department of Japanese Communication
 Department of English Communication

Departments that existed in the past 
 Department of Living and Welfare
 Department of Food Science and Nutrition

About the qualifications acquired 
 Qualifications as a librarian
 Department of Japanese Communication
 Department of English Communication 
 In addition, in the Department of Food Science and Nutrition that had been established in the past, one could acquire qualifications as a dietitian and a Second Class Nutrition Teacher's License.
 In the past, teacher training courses had been established where one could acquire a Second Class Junior High School Teacher's License.
 Japanese Language: Established in the Japanese Literature Department, which was the predecessor of the Department of Japanese Communication.
 English: Established in the English Literature Department, which was the predecessor of the Department of English Communication.
 Home Economics and Health: Established in the Department of Life and Culture, Life and Culture Major (formerly: Home Economics Department), which was the predecessor of the Department of Living and Welfare.
 Initially, a High School Teacher's License was also added, and resulted in (Japanese Language) in the Japanese Literature Department, (English) in the English Literature Department and (Home Economics) and (Health) in the Home Economics Department.

Student Life

Extracurricular activities, club activities and circle activities
 The club activities of Jissen Women's University Junior College are jointly conducted with the university, both in sports-type and culture-type.
 As of 2020, there are currently 65 university-approved student groups in total for culture-type and sports-type, including those under suspension of activities, and one semi-official group. They perform vigorous activities on both campuses every day.

School festivals 
 The school festival of Jissen Women's University Junior College is called the "Tokiwa Festival", and concerts and talk shows, where they invited famous people, and presentations for each club and circle are held respectively. By the way, the theme in the fiftieth school festival held in fiscal 2006 amounted to "A Profusion of Flowers."
 At the sixth Tokiwa Festival in 2010, the talk shows were cancelled as a consequence of the typhoon, but the live comedy performances were carried out in spite of it. EXIT, Shizuru, 3 O'Clock Heroines, etc. appeared in the live comedy performances.

University officials and organizations

List of university officials

University officials 
 Tetsuto Uno: Its first president
 Tokuhei Yamagishi
 Kenji Shuzui
 Tokuhei Yamagishi ②
 Kenji Shuzui ②
 Rikichi Katsurada
 Motoi Tada
 Nōichi Imoto
 Masami Yoshikawa
 Junsaku Fundō
 Toshirō Iijima
 Shigeo Yuasa: Became president in 2007.

Alumni 
 Kazuko Inano – actor, dropout
 Keiko Kurihara – former actress
 Sakura Tange – voice actress
 Keiko Mori – former Nishinippon Broadcasting announcer
 Yōko Matsuoka – former freelance announcer (former member of cent. Force)
 Yasuko Kuramoto – fashion model
 Taki Kusano – novelist
 Yōko Umeda – novelist, sports writer
 Hiroko Kitamura – freelance announcer
 Hazuki Kurosawa – Gravure idol, talent

Facilities

Campus 
 They have made a 10-story building into Shibuya Campus. At Shibuya Campus, the students of the university's Faculty of Humanities and the Faculty of Human and Social Studies are studying together with the students of the junior college department.
 Jissen Women's University and Jissen Women's University Junior College Library

External affairs

Agreements with other universities

America 
 America (Hawaii) Kapiolani Community College (studying abroad)
 America (Hawaii) Leeward Community College (studying abroad)

Australia 
 Stott's College (studying abroad)
 University of the Sunshine Coast (studying abroad)
 Victoria University (studying abroad)

Malaysia 
 Asia Pacific University (studying abroad)

Related schools 
 Tokyo Private Junior College Association Consortium

Affiliated schools 
 Jissen Women's University

Involvement with society 
 The students of the Department of Japanese Communication had been participating in the editing of Hino City's garbage information magazine.

About careers after graduation

About finding employment 
 Department of Japanese Communication: Kokubu Business Expert, Toyota Enterprise, Toyota Enterprise, Bic Camera, Yamada-Denki, Shōwa Shinkin Bank, Taiju Life Insurance, The Yokohama Shinkin Bank, Subaru, Mitsubishi Pencil and SoftBank
 Department of English Communication: Art Corporation, ANA Airport Services, Isuzu Motors, Canon, Sogō & Seibu, Honda Cars, Advance, Fuji Software Service, NEC Management Partner, Airport Terminal Service, Granbell Hotel, Keiō Plaza Hotel and Tōkyū Resort Service

Transfer admissions and advancement to higher education track records 
 Other than the affiliated Jissen Women's University, they have the following track records.
 Department of Japanese Communication: Nihon University, Tokyo Keizai University, Sagami Women's University, Taisho University, Toyo Gakuen University, Keisen University, Komazawa University, Komazawa Women's University, Kaetsu University, Kyorin University and Nishogakusha University
 Department of English Communication: Komazawa University, Komazawa Women's University, Tokai University, Kaetsu University, Sōka University, Tokyo Woman's Christian University, Kyoritsu Women's University, Takushoku University and Tamagawa University

See also 
 List of junior colleges in Japan
 Shukutoku Gakuen Junior College: Because Jissen Women's Junior College had been established on the site of this campus.

Further reading 
 『全国学校総覧』 (National School Directory); published fiscal 1955 (Shōwa's 30th Year) – present.
 『全国私立大學・短期大學入学案内』 (National Private Universities and Junior Colleges Admission Guide); co-edited by The Association of Private Universities of Japan and The Association of Private Junior Colleges of Japan (co-editor); published for fiscal 1952 (Shōwa's 27th Year). 
 『教員養成課程認定大学短期大学一覧』 (List of Accredited Universities and Junior Colleges with Teacher Training Courses); edited by the Ministry of Education, Culture, Sports, Science and Technology, Higher Education and Science Bureau.
 『教員養成課程認定大学・短期大学等総覧』 (Complete Guide to Accredited Universities, Junior Colleges, etc. with Teacher Training Courses); edited by the National Association of Upper Secondary School Principals; published by Dai-Ichi Hōki Publishing.
 『全国短期大学一覧』 (List of National Junior Colleges); published in fiscal 1950 – fiscal 1985.
 『日本の私立短期大学』 (Private Junior Colleges in Japan); published by The Association of Private Junior Colleges in Japan; published in 1980; page 94.
 『進学年鑑』 (Advancing to Higher Education Yearbook); separate volume of the 『私大コース』 (Private University Courses) series.
 『全国短期大学高等専門学校一覧』 (List of National Junior Colleges and Technical Colleges); edited by the Bunkyō Association Foundation; published in fiscal 1974 (Shōwa's 49th Year) – present.
 『短大蛍雪 (螢雪時代)』 (Tandai Keisetsu); published by Ōbunsha; part of the 『全国短大&専修･各種学校受験年鑑』 (National JC, STC and Miscellaneous School Entrance Examinations Yearbook) series.
 『全国短期大学受験要覧』 (National Junior College Entrance Examination Handbook); published by Kōjunsha; published in fiscal 1970 – fiscal 1996.
 『全国短期大学案内 (教学社)』 (National Junior College Guide); published by Kyohak Publishing; published in fiscal 1995 – Present.
 『全国短期大学受験案内』 (National Junior College Entrance Examination Guide); published by Shōbunsha; published in fiscal 1965 (Shōwa's 40th Year) – present.
 『全国短期大学案内 (梧桐書院)』 (National Junior College Guide); published by Gotōshoin; published for fiscal 1971 – present.
 『実践女子短期大学』 (Jissen Women's Junior College); admission guide booklet.
 "実践女子学園の歩み" ("History of Jissen Women's Educational Institute"); https://www.jissen.ac.jp/school/history/index.html

References

External links
  Jissen Women's Junior College (old link)
 Jissen Women's University (new link)

Universities and colleges in Tokyo
Educational institutions established in 1950
Japanese junior colleges
Private universities and colleges in Japan
1950 establishments in Japan
Women's universities and colleges in Japan